Briel or Den Briel is a parish in the Denderstreek in East Flanders, Belgium. A part of the parish is located in the municipality of Buggenhout, the other part is located in the sub-municipality Baasrode in the city Dendermonde.

Buggenhout
Dendermonde
Populated places in East Flanders
de:Buggenhout#Briel